Deepakk Sunil Prasadh is an Indian film director and writer.

Life and career
Born in Mumbai, Deepakk Sunil Prasadh was a bright student, He would visit shooting floors since the age of 6, it is here he dreamt of becoming a Director.
Training began early for him. He started off as an Assistant Editor on the TV show Sanskriti on Star Plus. After understanding the ropes of editing, Deepakk Sunil Prasadh started assisting Mr. Tony Singh on the show Jassi Jaissi Koi Nahin. After a brief stint of TV he set his sights on Films and joined Mr. Kabir Sadanand as an Assistant Director on the Pritish Nandy Communications Produced Hindi Movie Popcorn Khao! Mast Ho Jao.  Deepakk Sunil Prasadh continued his work with Kabir Sadanand on various TV shows like CID, CID Special Bureau, Akayla, etc.

Filmography

References

External links

1981 births
Living people
Film directors from Mumbai
Indian male screenwriters
Indian television writers
Male television writers